Shah Ismail Order, is the highest Azerbaijani military award presented by the Commander-in-chief and President of the Republic of Azerbaijan.

History and status
Shah Ismail Order was among several medals and orders, requested to be reviewed and created by the President Abulfaz Elchibey on November 10, 1992 by a Presidential Decree No. 370. The order was created by the Decree No. 755 of the President of Azerbaijan, Heydar Aliyev and ratified by National Assembly of Azerbaijan on December 6, 1993. The Shah Ismail Order is given to the high-ranking officers of Azerbaijani Armed Forces the following services:
special contributions in organization of development and strengthening of Azerbaijani Armed Forces;
distinguished acts in defending the territorial integrity of Azerbaijan Republic;
distinguished courage in the military;
special contributions in eliminating emergency situations in the country.

The order is pinned to the left side of the chest. If there are any other orders or medals, the Shah Ismail Order follows Istiglal Order (Order of Sovereignty).

Description
Shah Ismail Order is made of two layers. The bottom silver layer is in the shape of eight-pointed star. The smaller top layer is an octagon plate bathed in pure gold with a depiction of a side-view image of Shah Ismayil Safavi. The rear side of the order is polished and has an engraved order number and words Şah İsmayıl.
The composition is attached to a red colored watered silk ribbon bar with five edges.

Previous version
The previous description was quite different from the current version of the order. The order was round shaped and the edges were made from pure gold. The center of the order was in the shape of a shield and was colored with blue color. The image of Shah Ismail was depicted in the center of the shield with words Şah İsmayıl written right below the picture. The shield was placed on diagonally crossed sword and mace.

References

Orders, decorations, and medals of Azerbaijan
Awards established in 1993
1993 establishments in Azerbaijan